KHUT (102.9 MHz) is a commercial FM radio station broadcasting a country music radio format. Licensed to Hutchinson, Kansas, the station serves the Wichita metropolitan area and is owned by Eagle Communications, Inc.

KHUT goes by the slogan "Country 102.9, Hutchinson's Country Station."  It has an effective radiated power (ERP) of 100,000 watts, broadcasting since 1972.  The transmitter is on Whiteside Road at West Clark Road in Hutchinson.

Talent
Weekday mornings are hosted by Pat James.  James started with Eagle Radio Hutchinson in March 2017, and was soon elevated to Operations Manager of the cluster.  James comes to Hutchinson after previous stops in Wichita, St. Louis and Gainesville, FL. He is best known for his years at KFDI-FM in Wichita and at WIL-FM in St. Louis as part of the CMA Award Winning Cornbread Show. Before coming to KHUT, he was Program Director of BOB-FM and HANK-FM in Wichita. In his first year on the air at KHUT, he was nominated for the Academy of Country Music Small Market Personality of the Year.

Hutchinson native and musician Morgan Wilk handles middays from 10am to 3pm.

Randy McKay is on-air in afternoons from 3pm to 7pm.  Randy has been a radio announcer since 1979.  Randy is also Country 102.9's Program Director and Music Director.  He was with KHUT from 1989 to 1992 left for a stint in Salina, KS and returned in 2000.

DJ Dan Michaels is on in the evenings from 7pm to midnight.

Nick Gosnell, News Director, delivers the morning news on Country 102.9 and also oversees news on KHMY and KWBW, as well as Hutch Post.com, Eagle's growing local online news source. Gosnell came to Eagle Radio in January 2020, replacing longtime News Director Fred Gough, who retired. Gosnell was previously News Director at WIBW in Topeka. He is assisted in the news department by Rod Zook, who covers Noon and afternoon drive news.

KHUT is also the flagship station for the Hutchinson Community College Blue Dragons football and basketball teams.  The Country 102.9 Blue Dragon sports crew includes Sports Director Glen Grunwald, Daren Dunn, Dan Naccarato, Rob Dreher and Steve Carpenter.

History
KHUT's predecessor, KWBW-AM was the first commercial AM station in central Kansas. A sister station to KHMY-FM and KHUTY-FM, KWBW-AM began broadcasting June 15, 1947 at 1450. MHz. KWBW-FM began broadcasting at 98.5 in 2013. The stations were owned by William Wyse.

On the air originally as KWBW-FM, the station played country music from 1972 to 1978. After a short-lived switch to a Beautiful Music format, the station changed call letters to KHUT and returned to Country music in 1979. Owned originally by Nation's Center Broadcasting, the founding company of sister station KWBW, KHUT was purchased by Beach-Schmidt Communications in 1989.  Beach-Schmidt is now employee owned Eagle Communications headquartered in Hays, Kansas.

References

External links

HUT
Country radio stations in the United States
Radio stations established in 1972